Evermore is an anthology of short stories about or in honor of Edgar Allan Poe and edited by James Robert Smith and Stephen Mark Rainey.  It was released in 2006 by Arkham House in an edition of approximately 2,000 copies.

Contents 

Evermore contains the following tales:

 "Introduction", by James Robert Smith and Stephen Mark Rainey
 "All Beauty Sleeps", by Joel Lane
 "The Clockwork Horror", by F. Gwynplaine MacIntyre
 "The Impelled", by Gary Fry
 "The Resurrections of Fortunato", by John Morressy
 "They Call Me Eddie", by Rick Hautala & Thomas F. Monteleone
 "Cloud by Night", by Melanie Tem
 "Poe 103", by Ken Goldman
 "From the Wall, a Whisper", by Kealan Patrick Burke
 "When It Was Moonlight", by Manly Wade Wellman
 "In Articulo Mortis", by Trey R. Baker
 "Night Writing", by Charlee Jacob
 "Of Persephone, Poe, and the Whisperer", by Tom Piccirilli
 "An Author and His Character", by Vincent Starrett
 "The Masque of Edgar Allan Poe", by Steve Rasnic Tem
 "The White Cat", by Fred Chappell
 Evermore Contributor Bios

See also 
 Edgar Allan Poe in popular culture

2006 anthologies
Horror anthologies
Edgar Allan Poe
Arkham House books